Filipp Kuzmich Mironov (1872–1921) was a Bolshevik revolutionary leader during and after the Russian Revolution. He actively supported the idea of democracy in the form of the Soviet Republic, was one of the first commanders in the Red Army. Loyal to the Revolution, he was condemned to death at a show-trial organized by Trotsky.  He was pardoned on the eve of this execution, but later re-arrested and shot.

Biography
Filipp Kuzmich Mironov was born in 1872 on the farm Buerak-Senyutkin, in the village of Ust-Medveditskaya, into a Cossack family of the Don Host. He graduated from the parochial school and three classes of the gymnasium, having mastered the rest of the course on his own.

On June 18, 1906, he spoke at a meeting of the Cossacks of the Ust-Medveditsky district with a call to abandon the police service. On the way back, all three were arrested in Novocherkassk and sentenced to 3 months of arrest in a military guardhouse. After a new meeting of the Ust-Medveditsky Cossacks declared the district chieftain hostage, Mironov, Ageev and Burykin were released. But soon Mironov was expelled from the Don army (with the deprivation of the rank of lieutenant "for actions discrediting the rank of an officer").

With the outbreak of World War I, he volunteered for the front as part of the 30th Don Regiment of the 3rd Don Division, became the commander of the reconnaissance sotnia of this division (he was given back the rank of cavalier), was promoted to yesaul (March 1915) and military foremen (January 1916), and was awarded the Golden Weapon for Bravery. Over the next three years, he was awarded two more orders. From March 1916, he acted as assistant commander of the 32nd Don Regiment for combat units.

After the October Revolution of 1917 he joined the Bolsheviks. During the Russian Civil War, he commanded large military formations, including the 2nd Cavalry Army. He enjoyed very great popularity among the Don population. He opposed the policy of decossackization and did not receive the support of Leon Trotsky in matters of interaction with the peasantry. In September 1918, he was awarded the Order of the Red Banner No. 3, becoming one of the first cavaliers.

He opposed the incompetent, in his opinion, military leadership of Trotsky. Having learned about the circular letter on decossackization, apparently falsified at the initiative of the Donburo, in a letter to Grigory Sokolnikov, a member of the Revolutionary Military Council of the Southern Front, Mironov wrote: "...it's time to disperse the political adventurers from the Donburo (Syrtsov, Larin, Khodorovsky, etc.), and with them Trotsky from the army..." In August 1919, his opposition to the leadership of the Red Army led him to mutiny, declaring his intention to himself take the leadership of the Southern Front against the Volunteer Army of Anton Denikin. He declared:

For his unauthorized expedition, he was arrested the following month by Semyon Budyonny and sentenced to death, but Trotsky himself stopped the execution and Mironov was pardoned by the All-Russian Central Executive Committee. According to the version of the Whites, in August 1919, Mironov raised an uprising, which was joined by several Red Cossack regiments. The uprising was suppressed in a few days by the troops of Budyonny (4th Cavalry Division of Oka Gorodovikov, later Deputy Commander Mironov).

At a meeting of the Politburo of the Russian Communist Party on October 23, 1919, political confidence was expressed in Mironov and, later, command of the 2nd Cavalry Army was entrusted to him.

In 1920 he joined the Russian Communist Party. Participated in the defeat of the White troops at Sivash and the expulsion of the remnants of the White armies from Crimea.

In February 1921, he was arrested on a false accusation of Donchek, when he carelessly drove into his native village (Mironov made many enemies in the Revolutionary Military Council, both among Trotsky’s supporters and his opponents, Budyonny and Voroshilov, for openly criticizing the decossackization policy). He was killed by a sentry in the courtyard of the Butyrka prison under unclear circumstances. Researchers Roy Medvedev and S. P. Starikov claimed that Mironov was killed on the personal order of Leon Trotsky. He was rehabilitated by the Military Collegium of the Supreme Court of the Soviet Union in 1960 "due to the lack of corpus delicti".

Mironov's son-in-law  was also arrested by the Cheka, but was subsequently released. He was later shot during the Great Purge.

Personal life
He was born in Ust-Medveditskaya and graduated from Novocherkassk military cadet school.

He commanded the 2nd Cavalry Army between 6 September and 6 December 1920, with which he participated in the Siege of Perekop (1920).

Sources

http://www.hrono.ru/biograf/mironov.html

References

Bolsheviks
Don Cossacks
Russian revolutionaries
People of the Russian Revolution
Soviet military personnel of the Russian Civil War
Victims of Red Terror in Soviet Russia
1872 births
1921 deaths